Smyrna is an unincorporated community in Jefferson County, Indiana, in the United States. It is also called Creswell.

A post office called Creswell operated from 1869 until 1902.

References

Unincorporated communities in Jefferson County, Indiana
Unincorporated communities in Indiana